The 1975 Eastern Michigan Hurons football team represented Eastern Michigan University as an independent during the 1975 NCAA Division II football season. In their second and final season under head coach George Mans, the Hurons compiled a 4–6 record and outscored their opponents, 198 to 171. The team's statistical leaders included Jerry Mucha with 526 passing yards and Clarence Chapman with 634 rushing yards and 194 receiving yards.

In May 1976, coach Mans announced his resignation as the school's head football coach in what the Associated Press described as a "surprise move."  According to one newspaper report, Mans resigned "when it became apparent that EMU would place a greater emphasis on basketball, hiring former Detroit Pistons coach Ray Scott."  Mans compiled an 8–12–1 record in two seasons as the head football coach at Eastern Michigan.

Schedule

References

Eastern Michigan
Eastern Michigan Eagles football seasons
Eastern Michigan Hurons football